Mick Doyle (13 October 1941 – 11 May 2004) was an Irish rugby union international player and coach.

Youth and playing career

Doyle was born in Castleisland, County Kerry, and began playing rugby union at Newbridge College, County Kildare. He went on to study veterinary science at University College Dublin, who he also represented at rugby. He made his Ireland debut against France on 23 January 1965, scoring a try in the game. While representing Ireland he also studied at Cambridge University where he gained a Blue in the 1965 Varsity match against the Oxford University RFC. Doyle also studied at the University of Edinburgh and played club rugby for Edinburgh Wanderers before returning to Ireland.

He went on to earn the distinction of never being dropped during his 20-cap international career as a flanker. Doyler, as he was affectionately known, scored the winning try against Wales in 1967, toured Australia with Ireland in 1967 and South Africa with the British and Irish Lions the next year.

His last game for Ireland was against Australia in October 1968, when he lined out alongside his brother Tommy.

Coaching
He coached Leinster to Interprovincial Championship success five times between 1979 and 1983 before he succeeded Willie John McBride as Ireland coach during the 1984–85 season. Under Doyle's stewardship in 1985 Ireland won the Triple Crown and Five Nations Championship.

He led Ireland to the inaugural 1987 Rugby World Cup, but that joy was tinged with sadness as he suffered a heart attack at the opening dinner. He battled illness and adversity and his recovery from a brain problem was chronicled in his book '0.16'.

Media
After retiring from coaching, Doyle became a TV expert on RTÉ television, starting with the 1991 World Cup, and continuing both on live coverage and their "Rugby After Dark" Sunday night highlights programme until having to step down through ill-health in the late-90s.

Apart from working in his veterinary practice, he was a regular rugby contributor on RTÉ Radio One in the later years of his life.

Mick Doyle was killed in a car crash in Dungannon on 11 May 2004.

See also
 Irish Rugby Football Union
 Ireland national rugby union team

References

External links
RTÉ News - Death of Mick Doyle
- Guardian obituary

scrum.com
 The Independent obituary

1941 births
2004 deaths
Alumni of the University of Edinburgh
Alumni of University College Dublin
Blackrock College RFC players
Irish rugby union players
Ireland international rugby union players
Irish rugby union coaches
Munster Rugby players
University College Dublin R.F.C. players
Leinster Rugby non-playing staff
People from Castleisland
Road incident deaths in the Republic of Ireland
British & Irish Lions rugby union players from Ireland
Cambridge University R.U.F.C. players
Irish veterinarians
Ireland national rugby union team coaches
Edinburgh Wanderers RFC players
People educated at Newbridge College
Rugby union flankers
Rugby union players from County Kerry